Yudanovka is a rural locality (a selo) and the administrative center of Yudanovskoye Rural Settlement, Bobrovsky District, Voronezh Oblast, Russia. The population was 611 as of 2010. There are 4 streets.

Geography 
Yudanovka is located 32 km northwest of Bobrov (the district's administrative centre) by road. Peskovatka is the nearest rural locality.

References 

Rural localities in Bobrovsky District